Jito Kayumba is a Zambian investment professional and business strategist who is currently a Special Assistant and advisor to President Hakainde Hichilema on Economic, Investment and Development Affairs since September 2021. Previously, he served as a partner at Kukula Capital, a venture capital firm in Zambia.

Jito Kayumba has sat on the boards of Airtel Zambia Plc, Zambian Breweries Plc, Famous Brands Zambia, Betternow Finance Company, iSchool Zambia, among others.

Career and education
Kayumba studied political science and economics. He did his postgraduate in Canada before moving back to Zambia. He also holds a Master of Business Administration.

Prior to joining the Hichilema administration, Kayumba served on different Zambian boards including Airtel and Zambian Breweries Ltd.

References 

Living people
People from Lusaka
Year of birth missing (living people)